Michael Ritchie (born October 17, 1957) is an American artistic director of Center Theatre Group, overseeing the Mark Taper Forum, the Ahmanson Theatre and the Kirk Douglas Theatre.

Career

Early career
Ritchie began his professional career in the theatre in 1980 as a production stage manager in New York City. Over the next 15 years, he stage-managed more than 50 shows on and off-Broadway including productions at Lincoln Center Theater, Circle in the Square, Circle Rep, the New York Shakespeare Festival, Playwrights Horizons, New York City Center and the National Actors Theatre.

Among the notable productions he stage managed were Our Town with Spalding Gray and Eric Stoltz, Timon of Athens with Brian Bedford, Heartbreak House with Rosemary Harris and Rex Harrison, Candida with Joanne Woodward, You Never Can Tell with Uta Hagen and Philip Bosco, Arms and the Man with Kevin Kline and Raul Julia, A Streetcar Named Desire (two productions: one with Blythe Danner, Aidan Quinn and Frances McDormand, and the other with Jessica Lange, Alec Baldwin and James Gandolfini) and Present Laughter with George C. Scott, Nathan Lane, Christine Lahti, Jim Piddock, and Kate Burton.

Williamstown Theatre Festival
In 1996, Ritchie was appointed producer of the Williamstown Theatre Festival. New plays that began their lives in Williamstown and moved on to off-Broadway runs under his direction include Corners by David Rabe, Far East by A.R. Gurney, The Most Fabulous Story Ever Told by Paul Rudnick, Chaucer in Rome by John Guare, The Glimmer Brothers (Glimmer, Glimmer and Shine) by Warren Leight and The Waverly Gallery by Kenneth Lonergan.

American premieres during this time include The Late Middle Classes by Simon Gray, Misha's Party by Richard Nelson, Observe the Sons of Ulster Marching Towards the Somme by Frank McGuinness, Under the Blue Sky by David Eldridge and The Ride Down Mt. Morgan by Arthur Miller.

Rediscovered American classics include Dead End, Johnny on the Spot, Street Scene and, 50 years after it was first presented on Broadway -- The Man Who Had All the Luck by Arthur Miller, a production that moved to Broadway and was chosen by Time magazine as one of the year's 10 Best Productions in 2002.

Ritchie and the Festival also sent several other productions to Broadway, including Hedda Gabler, One Mo' Time, The Price and The Rainmaker.

Other major revivals during Ritchie's direction include The Royal Family with Blythe Danner, Victor Garber and Andrea Martin, The Film Society with Cherry Jones and Carole Shelley, Camino Real with Ethan Hawke, A Raisin in the Sun with Ruben Santiago-Hudson and Viola Davis, Hot L Baltimore with Sam Rockwell and As You Like It with Gwyneth Paltrow.

In 2002, the Williamstown Theatre Festival was the recipient of the Regional Theatre Tony Award.

Center Theatre Group
On January 1, 2005, Ritchie joined Center Theatre Group as artistic director. In his first four seasons at CTG, he premiered the musicals The Drowsy Chaperone, Curtains, 13 and 9 to 5: The Musical (all of which moved to Broadway and received a combined 25 Tony Award nominations). He has produced 40 world premieres including the musicals Bloody Bloody Andrew Jackson and Sleeping Beauty Wakes, and the plays Bengal Tiger at the Baghdad Zoo, Water & Power and Yellow Face; and he presented a broad range of plays and musicals ranging from Dead End to Romance to The Black Rider to blockbusters such as Jersey Boys, Edward Scissorhands, God of Carnage, August: Osage County, Matilda, The Trip to Bountiful and Mary Poppins.

In addition, Ritchie inaugurated CTG’s New Play Production Program, designed to foster the development and production of new work.

Personal life
Ritchie was born in Worcester, Massachusetts.

In 1982, while stage managing a revival of Noël Coward's Present Laughter, Ritchie met actress Kate Burton, the daughter of actor Richard Burton. They married in 1985 and have two children, a son, actor Morgan Ivor, and a daughter, Charlotte Frances.

References

External links
 
 Center Theatre Group
 Interview at CurtainUp.com

1957 births
Living people
Artists from Worcester, Massachusetts
Assumption University (Worcester) alumni
American theatre managers and producers
Artistic directors